Emily Kame Kngwarreye (or Emily Kam Ngwarray) (1910 – 3 September 1996) was an  Aboriginal Australian artist from the Utopia community in the Northern Territory. She is one of the most prominent and successful artists in the history of Australian art.

Life and family 

Kngwarreye was born 1910 in Alhalkere in the Utopia Homelands, an Aboriginal community located approximately 250 kilometres north-east of Alice Springs. Her family was Anmatyerre. She was the youngest of three, with no biological children of her own. She was the sister-in-law of the artist Minnie Pwerle and the aunt of Pwerle's daughter, artist Barbara Weir. Kngwarreye was a parental custodian of Weir for seven years until Weir was forcibly removed from her homeland under a government program to assimilate mixed race children (see Stolen Generations). Kngwarreye's great niece is the painter Jeannie Pwerle. Her brother's children are Gloria Pitjana Mills and Dolly Pitjana Mills.

Kngwarreye grew up working on cattle stations. In June 1934 she moved  to the MacDonald Downs Homestead, located approximately 100 km east of Alhalkere, to work in the house and to muster cattle.

Kngwarreye worked in batik until 1988, when she was introduced to acrylics. She created more than 3,000 acrylic paintings over the next eight years.

Kngwarreye died in Alice Springs in September 1996.

Batik
As an elder and ancestral custodian of the Anmatyerre people, Kngwarreye had for decades painted for ceremonial purposes in the Utopia region. In 1977, she began to learn batik with the early guidance of a Pitjantjatjara artist from Ernabella named Yipati and instructors Suzanne Bryce, Jenny Green and Julia Murray. According to Bryce, Aboriginal women of the region wanted to learn handcrafts because they were especially suited for a traditional lifestyle.

Bryce and Green had imported the medium of batik to the Northern Territories from Indonesia in 1974. By the time Kngwarreye was introduced to the technique, Aboriginal artists had adapted key parts of the process to suit their own preferences. The Indonesian technique of applying wax with a pen-like instrument called a canting, for example, had been replaced by brushes, which often produced broader, more animated patterns on the fabric.

The introduction of batik marked a new era for Aboriginal women in the Northern Territories. Up to that point, their role had been to assist male painters, with only a few women ever creating their own works. In 1978, Kngwarreye and other prominent Aboriginal artists founded the Utopia Women's Batik Group. Initially a communal project, the program evolved into a framework where artists could develop their own individual styles. With twenty other women, she was introduced in that program to the methods of tie-dye, block painting and batik.

Acrylic painting 
Kngwarreye began to paint on canvas in the summer of 1988, with a painting project initiated by CAAMA Shop in association with Utopia Art Sydney. Ttled A Summer Project it was eventually acquired by the Holmes à Court Collection in West Perth who then sponsored a program to allow Utopia artists to paint for a period of time unhindered by commercial imperatives. Rodney Gooch, manager of the Central Australian Aboriginal Media Association (CAAMA), distributed 100 canvases and paints to the Utopia women, where they instructed the artists in the new medium. Over the summer holidays, (4  weeks) 80 painters completed 81 works. Rodney Gooch saw this as a new era for the women. The Holmes à Court Collection purchased all 81 paintings and through their curator Anne Marie Brody, they were exhibited in April at the S.H. Ervin Gallery, Sydney. 

 Kngwarreye once described her transition to acrylic painting as a less labor-intensive process that better suited her advancing years:I did batik at first, and then after doing that I learned more and more and then I changed over to painting for good...Then it was canvas. I gave up on...fabric to avoid all the boiling to get the wax out. I got a bit lazy – I gave it up because it was too much hard work. I finally got sick of it ... I didn't want to continue with the hard work batik required – boiling the fabric over and over, lighting fires, and using up all the soap powder, over and over. That's why I gave up batik and changed over to canvas – it was easier. My eyesight deteriorated as I got older, and because of that I gave up batik on silk – it was better for me to just paint.Her method was to place large sections of canvas on the ground and sit on them cross-legged. She applied paint using a long brush to reach across and into the creation. In one account, a dealer explained the presence of dog prints within a specific painting as a natural part of her ground-level method: "The dog walked across it," he said, "and she couldn't have cared less."

In the final two weeks of her life, Kngwarreye asked her nephew Fred Torres for materials to produce a series known today as My Country - Final Series, 1996. A gallerist of Indigenous Art in Sydney once described the period as an energetic push to create: "With no other materials, she dipped her one-inch gesso brush into a pot of paint. Over the next few days Emily painted 24 canvases like nothing she had ever done before."

Subject matter 
Works by Kngwarreye stem from a deep connection her tribal homeland, Alhalkere. The Museum of Contemporary Art Australia describes her subject matter as the "essence" of that region, with references to flora, fauna and Dreamtime figures from her environment. These include:

 Arlatyeye (pencil yam)
 Arkerrthe (mountain devil lizard)
 Ntange (grass seed)
 Tingu (a Dreamtime pup)
 Ankerre (emu)
 Intekwe (a favourite food of emus, a small plant)
 Atnwerle (green bean)
 Kame (yam seed pod)
The yam plant was an important source of food for the Aboriginal people of the desert. She painted many works on this theme; often her first actions at the start of a painting were to put down the yam tracking lines. This plant was especially significant for her: her middle name, Kame, means the yellow flower and the seeds of the pencil yam. She described her paintings as having meaning based on all the aspects of the community's life, including the yam plants.

Representation and commissions
Kngwarreye was part of the Utopia Women's Batik. In 1987 Rodney Gooch , manager of CAAMA Shop in Alice Springs was asked to represent them and they did so until 1991.

Christopher Hodges of Utopia Art Sydney represented Kngwarreye from 1988 to her death in 1996. from 1988 - 1991 through CAAMA Shop and following that directly through Rodney Gooch (Mulga Bore Artists)

In 1989, Delmore Gallery in the Delmore Downs homestead adjacent to Utopia commissioned 1,500 works from Kngwarreye. Delmore Downs operators Donald and Janet Holt sold Kngwarreye's work to elite galleries in Australia and gifted works to institutions.

By 1991 she was producing a range of work for a variety of galleries, including the Aboriginal Gallery of Dreamings in Melbourne  and the DACOU Aboriginal Gallery - Dreaming Art Centre Of Utopia, Adelaide.

Kngwarreye's earlier works with a Delmore Gallery provenance tend to perform best at auction, but her late-period works with Rodney Gooch have also demonstrated significant market potential.

Style

Works by Kngwarreye are rooted in marks painted on sand and the body during Anmatyere experiences within The Dreaming, a moral code based on "ancestral heroes whose pioneering travels gave form, shape, and meaning to the land, seas, and skies in a long-ago creative era." These ceremonial marks are therefore more than basic visual designs. They are a "ritual re-enactment of the Ancestors' Dreamtime travelling (sic) which, in Aboriginal mythology, are synonymous with the creation of the world."

Visual elements related to The Dreaming were important parts of the Desert Art Movement at Papunya Tula, where Kngwarreye first began to develop her skills as a painter. Formed by community elders in 1971 with the support of Geoffey Bardon, the school encouraged artists to develop their own ideas when painting on canvas. One familiar style was to overlap masses of tiny dots to create the optical effect of a heat shimmer, which appears in works by Kngwarreye as well as those of Johnny Warangkula Tjupurrula.  The influence of Desert Art also appears in her use of aerial perspective.

Her early works of the late 1980s used traditional colours such as red and yellow ochre, black and white. By 1990, she had expanded her palette to also include grey, purple and brown, which amplified the atmospheric qualities of her work.

In 1992, Kngwarreye began to join her dots to form lines, creating multicoloured parallel horizontal and vertical stripes that suggested rivers and desert terrain. She also began to use larger brushes during this period, which produced heavier, less intricate dots on the canvas.

In 1993, Kngwarreye added patches of colour along with the dots, which created the effect of coloured rings. An example is Alaqura Profusion, which was made with a shaving brush in what she called her 'dump dump' style using very bright colours. That technique also appears in My Mothers Country and Emu Country (1994).

Lines are another central feature in many of her paintings. Likely inspired by women's body paint during tribal ceremonies, interwoven lines in her art frequently reference the track lines of yams within Central Desert communities.

Success

In 1992, Kngwarreye was awarded an Australian Artist's Creative Fellowship by Prime Minister Keating & the Australia Council. She lived and worked at various places in the Sandover region. In 1993, Kngwarreye, Yvonne Koolmatrie and Judy Watson were chosen to represent Australia at the Venice Biennale.

The sale set a record for an Australian female artist.

In 2019 the Tate Gallery London purchased Untitled (Alhalkere) (1989), Untitled (1990) and Edunga (1990).

Exploitation
The rise in market demand in the 1990s for works by Indigenous artists spurred the growth of inexperienced, and, in some cases, fraudulent art dealers. Utopia became particularly attractive to outsiders seeking fast money through the acquisition of Indigenous art without understanding the culture that produced them. Kngwarreye was a desirable target for such profiteers. She once told a friend, for example, that she had "escaped from five or six carloads of 'art dealers' at Utopia." She was later documented saying that those who sought a quick profit from Indigenous art were employing a "strategy of producing bad quality paintings for bad people."

During her life, and after her death, authors and journalists reported that many of the works purportedly painted by Kngwarreye were, in fact, fakes. In 1997, the N.T. News suggested an organised 'school' of painters had created works in her style.

In 2018, British artist Damien Hirst was alleged to have copied Kngwarreye's style for his Veil Series. The artist claimed to have had no prior knowledge of her work, even though observers from the Utopia community viewed the similarities as too close to have been a coincidence. According to Hirst, the series was rooted in Pointillism, Impressionism and Post-Impressionism. Bronwyn Bancroft, however, an Indigenous artist and Arts Law Centre board member, was quoted as saying, "You can't actually copyright style ... [but] in many ways it's what's called a moral copyright element."

Exhibitions and gallery holdings 
The first public exhibition of Kngwarreye's silk batiks was in 1980, alongside works of Mona Byrne, an artist from Hermannsberg. The next year, 'Floating Forests of Silk' premiered at the Adelaide Festival Centre, curated by Silver Harris. In 1982, her work was on display at the Sydney Craft Expo and the Brisbane Commonwealth Games Exhibition, followed by showings at the Adelaide Festival Centre and the Alice Springs Craft Council in 1983.

Kngwarreye's first solo exhibition was held in 1990 at Utopia Art Sydney.

Her work was included in a 1996 exhibition at Monash University Gallery called Women hold up half the sky: The orientation of art in the post-war Pacific.

Kngwarreye represented Australia at the 1997 Venice Biennale alongside Yvonne Koolmatrie and Judy Watson. Their exhibition, titled "Fluent," was a multigenerational show, chosen "to highlight the spectrum of Aboriginal experience and artistic practice in Australia at the time." A contemporary review described the show as an "affirmation of the continuing influence of Aboriginal matriarchs in a society that is often defined as a patriarchy ... with interwoven concerns on the nature of the land and their connections to it."

In 1998, her batiks were on view at the National Gallery of Victoria, Melbourne, in an exhibition titled "Raiki Wara: Long Cloth from Aboriginal Australia and the Torres Strait."

Queensland Art Gallery held the first retrospective of Kngwarreye's work in 1998. It was curated by Margo Neale and featured a commissioned work by Kngwarreye for the opening. The exhibition was the first major national touring retrospective for an Indigenous artist in Australia, traveling to the Art Gallery of New South Wales, the National Gallery of Victoria and the National Gallery of Australia, Canberra.

From June to November 2000, the National Gallery of Australia presented "Aboriginal Art in Modern Worlds: World of Dreamings," consisting of works by Kngwarreye, Nym Bandak, Rover Thomas, John Mawurndjul, Fiona Foley, Tracey Moffatt, and artists from Ramingining and Wik communities. Prior to its opening in Canberra, the exhibit also traveled to the Hermitage Museum in St. Petersburg, Russia.

Her second retrospective, Utopia: The Genius of Emily Kame Kngwarreye, was held in 2008. Also curated by Neale, it opened at the National Museum of Art, Osaka, Japan, before moving to the National Art Center, Tokyo, and then to the National Museum of Australia, Canberra.

From November 2010 to March 2011, the Museum Ludwig in Cologne, Germany, presented "Remembering Forward: Painting by Australian Aborigines Since 1960." The show featured works by Kngwarreye and eight other Aboriginal artists, including Paddy Bedford, Queenie Mckenzie and Dorothy Napangardi.

In 2013 the Emily Museum, the first museum featuring a single Aboriginal artist, opened in Cheltenham, Victoria. It permanently closed three years later.

Wild Yam and Emu Food (1990), Kame Yam Awelye (1996) and Alhakere (1996) were shown at Gagosian Beverly Hills in 2019 alongside works by ten other Indigenous artists, most from the Northern Territory.

Utopia Art Sydney organized a major survey of Kngwarreye's career in March 2020. The exhibition was titled STRONG. Also in early 2020, D'Lan Contemporary staged an exhibition of her work in New York City at the High Line Nine gallery in Chelsea.

In 2022, Gagosian Paris organized the first solo exhibition of her paintings in France, in collaboration with D’Lan Contemporary, Melbourne. The title of the exhibit was "Emily: Desert Painter of Australia." It ran from January 21 to March 26.

Awards
 Australian Artist's Creative Fellowship, Australia Council, 1993.
 Inducted into the Victorian Honour Roll of Women, 2001.

See also
Australian art
Indigenous Australian art

References
Notes

Sources

Further reading
Butler, Rex (1997), The Impossible Painter, Australian Art Collector magazine, issue 2, October – December 1997

Hart, D. (1995), Emily Kame Kngwarreye: Paintings from 1989–1995, Parliament House, Canberra
Isaacs, J., Smith, T., Ryan, J., Holt, D., Holt, J. (1998), Emily Kngwarreye Paintings, Craftsman House, Smith, T. (Ed.). North Ryde, Sydney.

Neale, M. (1998), Emily Kame Kngwarreye: Paintings from Utopia, Macmillan Publishers, South Yarra, Victoria.
Neale, M. (2008), Utopia: The Genius of Emily Kame Kngwarreye, National Museum of Australia Press, Canberra.
Thomas, D. (1988), Earth's Creation: The Paintings of Emily Kame Kngwarreye, Malakoff Fine Art Press, North Caulfield, Victoria.

External links
 images of Kngwarreye's work on ArtNet
 Emily Kam Ngwarray at the Art Gallery of New South Wales
Emily Kngwarreye at the National Gallery of Australia
Emily Kngwarreye at the National Museum of Australia
Emily Kngwarreye at the Museum Ludwig, Cologne, Germany
Emily Kngwarreye on Design and Art Australia Online
Emily Kame Kngwarreye review by Grafico Topico's Sue Smith

1910 births
1996 deaths
Australian Aboriginal artists
Artists from the Northern Territory
Australian women painters
20th-century Australian painters
20th-century Australian women artists
People from Alice Springs